The chief of the Defence Staff (CDS;) is the professional head of the Canadian Armed Forces. As the senior military position, the chief of the Defence Staff advises the Cabinet, particularly the minister of national defence and the prime minister. The role is a Crown-in-Council appointment made by the viceroy on the advice of the prime minister.

Lieutenant-General Wayne D. Eyre was designated as the acting chief of the Defence Staff on 24 February 2021, following Admiral Art McDonald taking a voluntary paid leave pending an investigation by the Canadian Forces National Investigation Service. On 13 August 2021, Eyre was promoted to general and was appointed to the position on a permanent basis on 25 November 2021.

History
Until 1964, there existed a chief of the Naval Staff, as head of the Royal Canadian Navy; a chief of the General Staff, as head of the Canadian Army; and a chief of the Air Staff, as head of the Royal Canadian Air Force. A position known as the Chairman of the Chiefs of Staff Committee existed from 1951 to 1964, which had a loose coordination function, although it lacked the command and control responsibilities of the later position of chief of the Defence Staff (CDS). Only two officers served in the role in its 13-year history:General Charles Foulkes (1951–1960) and Air Chief Marshal Frank Robert Miller (1960–1964).

The position of chairman of the Chiefs of Staff Committee and the positions of the three service chiefs were abolished in 1964 and replaced by the position of CDS. This change was based on a white paper initiated by National Defence Minister Paul Hellyer in the Cabinet of Prime Minister Lester B. Pearson. Following the tabling of the white paper, the minister introduced legislation that took effect in August 1964. The newly established chief of the Defence Staff was to "head all of Canada's military forces, backed by a defence headquarters that was integrated and restructured to reflect six so-called functional commands, replacing eleven former service commands. Functional described a command that was non-geographic and beyond any particular service or traditional arm." In May 1967, Bill C-243 was passed by parliament and was effective as of 1 February 1968. The law dissolved the three armed services and created the Canadian Armed Forces under the command of the CDS. In 2011, the three functional commands—named Maritime Command, Land Force Command, and Air Command—had their original names reinstated, becoming once again the Royal Canadian Navy, Canadian Army, and Royal Canadian Air Force, respectively.

Rank and command
The chief of the Defence Staff (CDS) follows in rank only the commander-in-chief of the Canadian Armed Forces, who is the Canadian monarch represented by the governor general. The National Defence Act gives the authority to appoint the CDS to the Governor-in-Council; effectively, the governor general acting on the constitutional advice of his or her ministers of the Crown. The commander-in-chief is the person from whom the CDS receives his or her orders. However, according to the tenets of constitutional monarchy and responsible government, the monarch and viceroy almost always follow ministerial direction, meaning the CDS normally advises the prime minister and the rest of Cabinet directly on military matters.

The CDS has been charged with four main priorities, each having multiple sub-priorities: The first is to conduct operations, which includes the successful implementation of domestic and international operations, protection of the forces through a culture of risk management, and ensuring that recruitment is at a level required to sustain the operational forces at full potential to meet their commitments. Secondly, the CDS is expected to expand the regular and reserve forces to meet international and domestic obligations, which means the management of the Canadian Forces Recruiting Group so as to streamline the enlistment process of new forces members. The third task is to implement the national defence strategy as outlined by the King-in-Council, requiring both the acquisition of new equipment and the strengthening of diplomatic relations via the United Nations, North Atlantic Treaty Organization, and North American Aerospace Defence Command." Lastly, the CDS must enhance the forces' programme delivery while optimising the use of resources.

The CDS is also the chair of the Canadian Forces Decorations Advisory Committee, which reviews and recommends to the governor general members of the forces eligible to receive decorations for valour, bravery, and meritorious service, as well as Commander-in-Chief Unit Commendations. This committee mirrors that for the Order of Military Merit, of which the CDS is ex-officio a member and the Principal Commander.

Separately, the CDS presents the Chief of the Defence Staff Commendation to recognize activity or service beyond regular expectations. It can be presented to members of the Canadian Forces, civilian members of the Defence Team (in an overseas operation), and members of an allied foreign military (whose actions benefited Canada). The insignia for wear has the form of a gold bar bearing three gold maple leaves and the award comes with a scroll bearing the citation. The CDS also awards the Canadian Forces Medallion for Distinguished Service, which is given by the CDS on behalf of the entire forces.

Distinguishing flag 
The chief of the Defence Staff is entitled to fly the Canadian Armed Forces ensign, a white flag bearing the Canadian flag in the canton and defaced by the badge of the Canadian Forces, as their distinguishing flag.

Chiefs of the Defence Staff

See also
Chief of the Defence Force (Australia)
Chief of the Defence Staff (United Kingdom)
Chairman of the Joint Chiefs of Staff

Notes

References

External links
 
 National Defence Act

 
Canadian Armed Forces
 Chief
Chief of the Defence Staff
Canada